Cratylia bahiensis is a species of legume in the family Fabaceae. It is found only in Brazil.

References

Sources

Phaseoleae
Flora of Brazil
Vulnerable plants
Taxonomy articles created by Polbot